The Senior CLASS Award is presented each year to the outstanding senior NCAA Division I Student-Athlete of the Year in women's volleyball.  The award was established in 2010 and the first award went to Ellie Blankenship of the Northern Iowa Panthers.

So far, no men's version of this award has been created. Three NCAA sports that are sponsored for both men and women have Senior CLASS Awards for only one sex—ice hockey and lacrosse do not have women's awards, and volleyball does not have a men's award.

See also

 List of sports awards honoring women

Footnotes

References

External links 
 Official site

Volleyball awards
Student athlete awards in the United States
College sports trophies and awards in the United States
College women's volleyball in the United States
Sports awards honoring women
Awards established in 2010